Jerzy Trzeszkowski (born 10 January 1945) is a former international speedway rider from Poland.

Speedway career 
Trzeszkowski reached the final of the Speedway World Championship on two occasions in the 1967 Individual Speedway World Championship and the 1968 Individual Speedway World Championship.

He rode in the top tier of British Speedway, riding for Swindon Robins.

World final appearances

Individual World Championship
 1967 –  London, Wembley Stadium – 14th – 3pts
 1968 –  Gothenburg, Ullevi – 14th – 3pts

World Team Cup
 1967 -  Malmö, Malmö Stadion (with Antoni Woryna / Andrzej Wyglenda / Andrzej Pogorzelski / Zbigniew Podlecki) - 2nd - 26pts (4)

References 

1945 births
British speedway riders
Swindon Robins riders
Living people